Ledell Eackles (born November 24, 1966) is an American former professional basketball player who was selected by the Washington Bullets in the second round (36th overall pick) of the 1988 NBA draft. Eackles played in seven NBA seasons for the Bullets, Miami Heat and Washington Wizards, averaging 10.8 ppg in his career. His best season came during 1989–90 when he appeared in 78 games for the Bullets averaging 13.5 points.

Eackles played college basketball at the University of New Orleans and prepped at Broadmoor High School in Baton Rouge.

One of Eackles' sons, Ledell Eackles Jr., won two state championships at Woodlawn High School in Baton Rouge and went on to play college basketball for Campbell College. Another son, Ledrick, played basketball at McNeese State after transferring from Oakland University.

References

External links
Player profile

1966 births
Living people
African-American basketball players
American men's basketball players
American expatriate basketball people in Israel
Basketball players from Baton Rouge, Louisiana
Broadmoor High School alumni
Hapoel Tel Aviv B.C. players
Israeli Basketball Premier League players
Miami Heat players
New Orleans Privateers men's basketball players
Rapid City Thrillers players
Richmond Rhythm players
San Jacinto Central Ravens men's basketball players
Shooting guards
Washington Bullets draft picks
Washington Bullets players
Washington Wizards players
21st-century African-American people
20th-century African-American sportspeople